The 2009 Yakutia Ilyushin Il-76 crash occurred on 1 November 2009, when an Ilyushin Il-76 jet crashed shortly after takeoff from Mirny Airport in Yakutia, killing all 11 crew on board.

Chronology of events
The jet, owned by the Russian Ministry of Internal Affairs, took off, with eleven crewmembers on board, from Mirny Airport, where the onboard cargo had been unloaded. The aircraft was bound for the city of Irkutsk, when several minutes after liftoff it banked to the right, hit a slag heap from an old mine and crashed. There are suggestions that the aircraft failed to gain altitude and deviated off its flight path.

Reports suggest that in the days following the accident eleven bodies were pulled from the jet by rescuers.

Russia's air force had temporarily grounded all Il-76 aircraft after an engine broke off the wing of a plane while it was attempting to takeoff earlier that year. It was reported that the ban was still in place at the time of the accident, and it is not yet clear as to why the jet was used when the model had been grounded.

A special commission of the Russian Interior Ministry was assigned to investigate the cause of the accident.

The METAR in force at the time of the accident was UERR 312330Z 22005MPS CAVOK M24/M26 Q1030 NOSIG RMK QFE741 24450245=.

References

Aviation accidents and incidents in Russia
Aviation accidents and incidents in 2009
Ilyushin Il-76 crash, 2009
Accidents and incidents involving the Ilyushin Il-76
Transport in the Sakha Republic
November 2009 events in Russia
Sakha Republic